The Sacramento State Men's Rowing Team is a collegiate sports club representing the Sacramento State University in rowing.  The program is a club sport, not affiliated with the university athletic department and is governed by elected club officers.  Started in 1984 by students with head coach Steve Gallant, the crew is a member of the Western Intercollegiate Rowing Association (WIRA), whose participants are mostly non-Pac-10 schools on the West Coast.

As part of WIRA, the team has won multiple conference championships in the Varsity 8 and also had championship boats in several other events.

The team consists of male athletes and male or female coxswains. The team competes against schools such as Stanford, UC Davis, UC Berkeley, UC San Diego, Gonzaga, CSU Chico, CSU Stanislas, CSU Monterey Bay, and all other west coast institutions with rowing programs.

Facilities
The team meets and rows at the Sacramento State Aquatic Center located at Lake Natoma, which is one of the top rowing facilities in the United States.  The facility has a combination of multimillion-dollar facilities, stable year round weather, and the long, protected waters of Lake Natoma.  Facilities at the aquatic center include rowing specific training equipment, weight room, locker rooms, and showers.  The entire lake is surrounded by state park property which keeps the rest of the world from infringing on its waters. It is because of Lake Natoma that Sacramento State hosts most of the major rowing races in the Western US, and why the CSUS Men's Rowing Team has hosted the NCAA National Championships more than any other facility.

Coaches
Head Coaches:

References

External links
Official Team Web Site
California State University Sacramento
CSUS Aquatic Center
Friends of Sacramento State Men's Rowing

Sports clubs established in 1984
Rowing clubs in the United States
California State University, Sacramento
1984 establishments in California